The 1952 United States presidential election in New Jersey took place on November 4, 1952. All contemporary 48 states were part of the 1952 United States presidential election. Voters chose 16 electors to the Electoral College, which selected the president and vice president.

New Jersey was won by the Republican nominees, General Dwight D. Eisenhower of New York and his running mate Senator Richard Nixon of California. Eisenhower and Nixon defeated the Democratic nominees, former Governor Adlai Stevenson of Illinois and his running mate Senator John Sparkman of Alabama.

Eisenhower carried New Jersey with 56.81% of the vote to Stevenson's 41.99%, a margin of 14.83%. Eisenhower won 18 of the state's 21 counties, breaking 60% of the vote in 9 of them, and even breaking 70% in 3 of those. Stevenson for his part carried 3 urban counties; he won with majorities in Mercer County and Camden County, and won with a plurality in Hudson County. Eisenhower ultimately won election to the White House as a war hero, a political outsider, and a moderate Republican who pledged to protect and support popular New Deal Democratic policies, finally ending 20 years of Democratic control of the White House.

New Jersey in this era was usually a swing state with a slight Republican lean, and its results in 1952 adhered to that pattern. Democrat Franklin Roosevelt had won New Jersey in all 4 of his decisive nationwide victories in the 1930s and 1940s, but with the exception of his 1936 landslide, always by very narrow margins. In 1948, New Jersey had been narrowly won by Republican Thomas E. Dewey, even as he lost the election nationally. With Eisenhower's personal popularity propelling him to a decisive nationwide victory in 1952, New Jersey easily remained in the Republican column, its results making it about 4% more Republican than the national average.

Republicans won Passaic, Salem, and Middlesex counties for the first time since 1928. This was the first election since 1868 that a Republican won the election without Mercer County, and the first since 1860 to do so without Camden County.

Results

Results by county

See also
 Presidency of Dwight D. Eisenhower
 United States presidential elections in New Jersey

References

New Jersey
1952
1952 New Jersey elections